Frolovsky District is an administrative district (raion), one of the thirty-three in Volgograd Oblast, Russia. As a municipal division, it is incorporated as Frolovsky Municipal District. It is located in the center of the oblast. Its administrative center is the town of Frolovo (which is not administratively a part of the district). Population:  16,720 (2002 Census);

Administrative and municipal status
Within the framework of administrative divisions, Frolovsky District is one of the thirty-three in the oblast. The town of Frolovo serves as its administrative center, despite being incorporated separately as a town of oblast significance—an administrative unit with the status equal to that of the districts.

As a municipal division, the district is incorporated as Frolovsky Municipal District, with the administrative center in the settlement of Prigorodny. The town of oblast significance of Frolovo is incorporated separately from the district as Frolovo Urban Okrug.

References

Notes

Sources

Districts of Volgograd Oblast
